Nalewki is a former name of the Bohaterów Getta (Heroes of the Ghetto) street in Warsaw, Poland, as well as a name applied to the entire borough around it. The street runs from the Długa Street (Long Street) in the New Town towards what was the northern outskirts of the city in the 19th century, and the neighbourhood of Muranów. Until World War II inhabited primarily by Jews, after the war it was rebuilt only partially, part of its former course taken up by a park established after the war. (The historical Nalewki Street's intersection with Franciszkańska was one of the busiest corners of pre-World War II Warsaw; the present Bohaterow Getta does not get that far).

The name of the street and the area is derived from marshes that used to cover much of the area in the 18th century.

Streets in Warsaw